Holy Trinity Catholic Secondary School is a publicly funded Roman Catholic secondary school in  Courtice, Ontario, Canada.

History
The Holy Trinity is the Relational Matrix of Life "create, love, act". This school's name honours the prominent place of the Holy Trinity in the Christian faith.

The school was founded in 2003 and has been located at its current site since 2003.

CASA
Holy Trinity is home to a Centre for Autism Spectrum Assistance program (CASA).  The program works with autistic children and uses dedicated teachers, specially designed classrooms and a Snoezelen room.  The program supports 12 students.

Athletic programs
Holy Trinity has won several championships since opening in sports such as football, basketball, soccer, hockey, and have had students earn medals in wrestling.  The Senior Girls' Basketball team has made two consecutive appearances in the provincial championships (2005, 2006).  Senior Boys' (2005, 2009) and Senior Girls' (2007) Soccer teams have also made appearances in the provincial championships.  The school is home to the 2007 'AA' LOSSA Junior Girls', Senior Girls' and Junior Boys' Soccer champions. The Boys Varsity Field lacrosse team has become somewhat of a powerhouse program, capturing 'AA' LOSSA gold in 2015, 2016, 2017, 2018, 2019, and 2022. In addition to the LOSSA golds, the Varsity Lacrosse team captured gold at OFSSA Field Lacrosse Festival in 2016, 2019, and 2022, along with Bronze in the 2017 edition of the event.

Other extra-curricular programs

The school offers a variety of non-athletic programs including dramatic, musical, academic, and social justice clubs.  The Holy Trinity drama department puts on a performance every year.

Holy Trinity has a Student Cabinet, elected each spring, that has donated over $100 000 to the community since its inception.  The HT Student Cabinet led a Terry Fox Foundation fundraising campaign in September 2010, setting a school fundraising record of over $30 000.

Holy Trinity has a student-teacher-run program named "Trinity Earth" that raises awareness of environmental issues within the school and throughout the community at large. Trinity Earth has been instrumental in removing industry bottled water from our school board through education and the instalment of water bottle filling fountains in each school.  They have started a large community garden outside the community church.  Have planted many memorial trees, participated in educational activities with elementary school aged kids including CLOCA water shed program, garbage clean ups in wooded areas, community yard sales to promote reuse as a very important "R".  (Founding teacher of student group was Janice Bradshaw)

See also
List of high schools in Ontario

References

External links
Holy Trinity Catholic Secondary School

Catholic secondary schools in Ontario
High schools in the Regional Municipality of Durham
Educational institutions established in 2003
Buildings and structures in Clarington
2003 establishments in Ontario